Talkheh Zar or Talkhehzar may refer to:
 Talkheh Zar, Charam
 Talkheh Zar, Kohgiluyeh
 Talkheh Zar-e Olya, Kohgiluyeh County
 Talkheh Zar-e Sofla, Kohgiluyeh County